Ricardo Cirilo Vera Rebollo (born September 16, 1962 in Montevideo) is a retired long-distance runner from Uruguay.

Career

Vera competed for his native country in the men's 3.000 metres Steeplechase at two consecutive Summer Olympics, starting in 1992.

International competitions

References

1962 births
Living people
Athletes (track and field) at the 1983 Pan American Games
Athletes (track and field) at the 1987 Pan American Games
Athletes (track and field) at the 1991 Pan American Games
Athletes (track and field) at the 1995 Pan American Games
Athletes (track and field) at the 1992 Summer Olympics
Athletes (track and field) at the 1996 Summer Olympics
Uruguayan male long-distance runners
Olympic athletes of Uruguay
Pan American Games silver medalists for Uruguay
Pan American Games medalists in athletics (track and field)
Sportspeople from Montevideo
Uruguayan people of Spanish descent
World Athletics Championships athletes for Uruguay
Uruguayan male steeplechase runners
South American Games gold medalists for Uruguay
South American Games silver medalists for Uruguay
South American Games medalists in athletics
Competitors at the 1982 Southern Cross Games
Competitors at the 1986 Goodwill Games
Competitors at the 1994 Goodwill Games
Medalists at the 1991 Pan American Games